Dominic Kodwo Andoh (May 4, 1929 – May 17, 2013) was the Catholic archbishop of the Archdiocese of Accra, Ghana.

Ordained to the priesthood on  23 December 1956. Andoh was consecrated bishop on October 3, 1971, enthroned archbishop in July 1993 and retired in March 2005.

See also

Parish of St Sylvanus, Pokuase

References 

1929 births
2013 deaths
Ghanaian Roman Catholic archbishops
20th-century Roman Catholic bishops in Ghana
Roman Catholic archbishops of Accra